Kyangwali Refugee Settlement is a refugee camp in the Kibuube District (formerly Hoima District) in western Uganda. , Kyangwali is home to 125,039 people.

Background 
Refugees from Rwanda started to live in Kyangwali when the settlement was opened in the 1960s. From the 1990s to 2010s, refugees from the Democratic Republic of the Congo and the Republic of the Congo lived in Kyangwali. More than 38,000 people lived in Kyangwali in 2015. 

In 2018, the number of residents had risen to 83,558.  the population of the settlement had reached 125,039, in 42,428 separate households. Of these, 81% are women and children and 19% are youth aged between 15-24 years.

Social Services 
Kyangwali Refugee Settlement has more than 30 relief agencies trying to support refugees. These function as either an 'implementing partner', or an 'operating partner' with the UNHCR. Reportedly, a widespread perception among the more educated refugees is that the agencies promise donors more than they actually deliver. This has led to the formation of more than twenty community-based organisations (CBOs). Although the majority of these refugee-founded agencies rely on their own community resources, and the support of the refugee population itself to help the most vulnerable among them, some of the CBOs, such as CIYOTA the Planning for Tomorrow Youth Organisation (P4T), and Ray of Hope Africa (RAHA), have gone further, and gained national and international recognition from the UNHCR, the World Bank, and other agencies and donors.

The Kyangwali Star provide news to people living in Kyangwali.

Notes

References

External links
 
 

Refugee camps in Uganda
Hoima District
Populated places in Western Region, Uganda